Ammoglanis amapaensis is a species of pencil catfish and is found in the Rio Mapaoni, of the Rio Jari basin, in the Município Serra do Navio, at the Parque Nacional Montanhas do Tumucumaque, with a GPS coordinate of 2°11'39"N, 54°35'16"W, in the Estado do Amapá, Brazil.

References

Trichomycteridae
Catfish of South America
Taxa named by José Leonardo de Oliveira Mattos
Taxa named by Wilson José Eduardo Moreira da Costa
Taxa named by Cecile de Souza Gama
Fish described in 2008